"At the Sign of the Swingin' Cymbal" (alternatively titled "At the Sign of the Swinging Cymbal") is an instrumental piece written by Brian Fahey. The piece was first released in September 1960 under the name Brian Fahey and His Orchestra.

It is best known as Alan Freeman's signature song, having been used as the theme tune to his BBC Light Programme Pick of the Pops from 1961 to 1966.  The original version was proposed to Alan by the BBC producer Derek Chinnery. By April 1966 it was replaced as the main theme by "Quite Beside the Point" by the Harry Roberts Sound and written by Cliff Adams. But bits of the original "Swinging Cymbal" theme were used occasionally by Alan as jingles in the show. From 5 April 1970, the show used a new version of "At The Sign of the Swinging Cymbal" arranged by former Ladybirds singer Barbara Moore and recorded by Brass Incorporated. This version is still used by the BBC today.

The Propellerheads modernised the song in their 1998 re-imagining "Crash!" which was included on the second soundtrack of the film Austin Powers: The Spy Who Shagged Me.

Background 
After joining BBC Light Programme from Radio Luxembourg in 1961, Alan Freeman used the piece as his theme music for Records Around Five and a year later as the theme to Pick of the Pops.

References 

1960s songs
Instrumentals
Radio theme songs
Songs about musical instruments